This is a list of professional Go tournaments, for competitors in the board game of Go. The tradition, initiated by the Honinbo Tournament in Japan, is for an event to be run annually, leading up to a title match and the award of a title for one year to the winner. Tournaments do not consist, generally, of players coming together in one place for a short period, but are spread out over time.

International

Open

Major

Defunct tournaments
 Bailing Cup is a tournament sponsored by the Bailing Group of China every two years. Its full name is "Bailing Aitou Cup", by which it is distinguished with a Chinese national tournament with the same name "Bailing Cup". The winner's purse is 1,800,000 CNY. The current title holder (2019) is Ke Jie.
 Tianfu Cup (天府杯) is a tournament sponsored by China. The winner's purse is 2,000,000 CNY. The current title holder (2018) is Chen Yaoye.
 BC Card Cup was an annual tournament sponsored by BC Card. The winner's purse was 300,000,000 Won/$300,000. The last title holder (2012) was Paek Hong-suk.
 Fujitsu Cup was a tournament sponsored by Fujitsu and Yomiuri Shimbun. The winner's purse was 15,000,000 Yen/$142,000. The last title holder (2011) was Park Jeong-hwan.
 Tong Yang Cup was a competition sponsored by Tong Yang Investment Bank of South Korea. The last title holder (1998) was Lee Chang-ho.
 World Oza was a tournament sponsored by Toyota Denso every two years. The winner's purse was 30,000,000 Yen/$285,000. The last title holder (2008) was Gu Li.
 Zhonghuan Cup was a title sponsored by the Taiwan Qiyuan and JPMorgan Chase. The winner's purse was 2,000,000 TWD/$62,000. The competition was arguably not a major tournament because players from China have never participated and the prize money is considerably less than other major ones. The last title holder (2007) was Lee Chang-ho.

Women's
 Wu Qingyuan Cup (Go Seigen Cup)
 Bingsheng Cup

Defunct tournaments

 Haojue Cup
 Dali Cup

Continental

Open

Asia
Major
 Asian TV Cup is a title sponsored by NHK, KBS and CCTV.

Team
 Nongshim Cup is a title sponsored by Nongshim.
 Asian New Star Match

Defunct tournaments
 Jinro Cupun
 Teda Cup Super Match
 CSK Cup was a title sponsored by CSK.

China-Korea
 China-Korea Tengen is a title sponsored by Sports Korea and Xinmin Wanbao Newspapers.

China-Japan
 China-Japan Agon Cup is a title sponsored by Agon Shu.

Defunct tournaments

 China-Japan Meijin
 China-Japan NEC Super Go
 China-Japan Supermatches (1984–2001)
 China-Japan Tengen (1988–2002)

 China-Korea New Pro Wang was a title sponsored by BC Card.
 Kangwon-Land Cup was a title sponsored by Kangwon-Land. The winner's purse is 150,000,000 Won ($150,000).
 Riyuexing Cup was a title sponsored by Celestial NutriFoods.
 China-Korea Champions League was a league team tournament.

China-Taiwan

Team
 China-Taiwan Yayi Cup is a title sponsored by Yayi and the Taiwan Qiyuan.

Taiwan-USA
 Chai-chin Cup

Women's

Asia

Team
 Jeongganjang Cup is a title sponsored by Jeongganjang.

Defunct tournaments
 Bohae Cup
 Eastern Airlines Cup
 Women Go Contest

South Korea

Open
Major
 GS Caltex Cup is a title sponsored by GS Caltex. The winner's purse is 50,000,000 won/$51,000. The current title holder is Shin Jinseo.
 Guksu is a title sponsored by the Far East Daily News. The winner's purse is 40,000,000 Won/$42,500. The current title holder is Park Junghwan.
 Myeongin is a title sponsored by the SG Group. The winner's purse is 60,000,000 Won.

Minor
 Maxim Cup is a title sponsored by Baduk TV and Dong Suh Foods. The winner's purse is 15,000,000 Won/$16,000. The current title holder is Cho Han-seung.

Hayago
 Electron-Land Cup is a title sponsored by Korean Economic News, Baduk TV, and Cyber Kiwon. The winner's purse is 40,000,000 Won/$42,500. The current title holder is Lee Chang-ho.
 KBS Cup is a title sponsored by KBS. The winner's purse is 20,000,000 Won/$21,000. The current title holder is Shin Minjun.

Leagues
 Korean Baduk League is a league sponsored by Baduk TV. The current title holder is Youngnam Ilbo.

Defunct tournaments

 Wangwi
 Baccus Cup
 Baedalwang
 Chaegowi
 Gukgi
 Kiwang
 KT Cup
 KTF Cup
 LG Refined Oil Cup
 MBC TV Cup
 New Pros Strongest
 Paedal Cup
 Paewang
 SBS TV Cup
 Taewang

 The Kiseong was the Hanguk Kiwon equivalent to the Nihon-Kiin's Kisei competition and was sponsored by the Segye Ilbo (World Newspaper). The winner's purse was 18,000,000 SKW ($18,000). The last title holder was Park Young-Hoon (2008).
 BC Card Cup was a title sponsored by Sports Korea and BC Card. The winner's purse is 20,000,000 Won/$21,000. The current title holder is Kim Ki-young.
 SK Gas Cup was a title sponsored by SK Gas. The winner's purse is 10,000,000 Won/$8,500. The current title holder is Yun Junsang.
 Osram Cup was a title sponsored by Baduk TV. The current title holder is Kang Dongyoon.
 Ch'eongpung Cup was a title sponsored by Sungpu Air Purifiers. The current title holder is Kim Dongyeop.
 Yeongnam Ilbo Cup The winner's purse is 25,000,000 Won/$26,000. The current title holder is Park Young-Hoon.
 Sibdan Cup is a title sponsored by the Wonik Corporation. The winner's prize is 25,000,000 Won/$26,000. The current title holder is Park Junghwan.
 Prices Information Cup is a title sponsored by Korean Prices Information Foundation. The winner's purse is 22,000,000 Won/$23,000. The current title holder is Kim Jiseok.
 Chunwon is a title sponsored by Sports Korea. The winner's purse is 20,000,000 Won/$17,000. The current title holder is Park Junghwan.

Women's
 Female Guksu is a title sponsored by Korean Daily News. The winner's purse is 10,000,000 Won/$10,500. The current title holder is Rui Naiwei.
 Female Myungin is a title sponsored by Lami Cosmetics. The winner's purse is 8,000,000 Won/$8,500. The current title holder is Rui Naiwei.
 Female Kisung The current title holder is Rui Naiwei.

People's Republic of China

Open
Major
 Qisheng (Kisei) is a title sponsored by the Zhongguo Qiyuan. It was held between 1999–2001 and is relaunched in 2013. The winner's purse is 800,000 CNY. The current title holder (2019) is Lian Xiao.
 Mingren (Meijin) is a title sponsored by the Zhongguo Qiyuan. The current winner's purse is 150,000 CNY. The current title holder (2018) is Mi Yuting.
 Tianyuan (Tengen) is a title sponsored by Zhongguo Qiyuan, New People's Evening News and New People's Weiqi Monthly Magazine. The current winner's purse is 400,000 CNY. The current title holder (2018) is Lian Xiao.
 Changqi Cup is a title sponsored by the Zhongguo Qiyuan. The winner's purse is 450,000 CNY. The current title holder (2018) is Mi Yuting.

Minor
 Quzhou-Lanke Cup is a tournament held every two years. The winner's purse is 500,000 CNY. The current holder (2018) is Tan Xiao.
 Liguang Cup is a title sponsored by Ricoh. The winner's purse is 150,000 CNY. The current title holder (2015) is Ke Jie.
 Longxing (Ryusei). The winner's purse is 150,000 CNY. The current title hold (2019) is Jiang Weijie.
 Weifu Fangkai Cup. The winner's purse is 100,000 CNY. The current title holder (2018) is Gu Zihao.
 Xinren Wang (Shinjin-O) is a young players tournament for players under 30 and 7 dan. It is sponsored by Shanhai Qiyuan. The winner's purse is 40,000 CNY. The current title holder is (2015) Liao Yuanhe.
 National Go Individual The current title holder is (2018) Chen Zijian.

Hayago
 CCTV Cup is a title sponsored by the CCTV. It is renamed China Citic Bank Cup since 2012 due to the sponsor change. The current winner's purse is 200,000 CNY. The current title holder is (2019) Ding Hao.
 Ahan Tongshan Cup (Agon Cup) is a title sponsored by Agon Shu. The winner's purse is 200,000 CNY. The current title holder (2018) is Gu Zihao.
 Xinan Wang is a title sponsored by Gyuqjing. The winner's purse is 50,000 CNY. The current title holder (2019) is Ke Jie.

Leagues
 Chinese A League The current title holder is Team Chongqing (2012).

Defunct tournaments

 NEC Cup
 Bawang
 All Chinese Championship
 Da Guo Shou
 Five Cows Cup
 Friendship Cup
 Lebaishi Cup
 Nanfang Cup
 NEC Xinxiu Cup
 New Sports Cup
 New Physical Education Cup
 Qiwang
 Top Ten Tournament
 Yongda Cup

Women's
 Female Weiqi Title is a title sponsored by Guodu. The current title holder is Ye Gui.
 Xianye Cup is a title sponsored by Xianye. The current title holder is Zhang Xiang.
 Bailing Cup is a title sponsored by Bailing Medicine Manufacturer. The current title holder is Li He.
 Women's Xinren Wang is a title sponsored by the Zhongguo Qiyuan. The current title holder is Cao Youyin.

Taiwan
Major
 Tianyuan (Tengen) is a title sponsored by Minsheng Newspaper and the Taiwan Qiyuan. The current holder is Lin Zhihan.
 Wangzuo (Oza) is a title sponsored by the Taiwan Qiyuan. The current holder is Chen Shiyuan.
 Guoshou (National Champion) is a title sponsored by the Taiwan Qiyuan. The current holder is Lin Zhihan.

Minor
 CMC TV Cup is a title sponsored by the Taiwan Qiyuan. The current holder is Lin Zhihan.
 Donggang Cup is a title sponsored by Donghe Gangtie and the Taiwan Qiyuan. The current holder is Chen Shiyuan.
 Zhonghuan Cup is a title sponsored by the Taiwan Qiyuan. The current holder is Lin Shuyang.
 New Star Match is a title sponsored by the Taiwan Qiyuan. The current holder is Yoo Kyeongmin.

North America 
 US Open The current title holder is Yuhan Zhang, 2007 title holder is Yongfei Ge, 2006 title holder is Andy Liu.
 North American Ing Masters is a title sponsored by the Ing Foundation. The current title holder is Andy Liu, 2008 title holder is Yun Feng, 2007 title holder is Mingjiu Jiang, 2006 title holder is Zhaonian Chen.
 North American Redmond Cup is a title named for US-born Japanese pro Michael Redmond and funded by the Ing Foundation. It has two divisions, junior and senior. Current junior title holder is Hugh Zhang and senior title holder is Gansheng Shi, 2007 junior title holder is Calvin Sun and senior title holder is Curtis Tang.
 U.S.-Canada Team Tournament The current winner is U.S. team.

Defunct tournaments
 North American Masters Tournament

Japan

Open

Nihon Ki-in 
Major
 Kisei is a title sponsored by the Yomiuri Shimbun Newspaper. The winner's purse is 45,000,000 Yen/$505,000. The current title holder is Ichiriki Ryo.
 Meijin is a title sponsored by the Asahi Newspaper. The winner's purse is 37,000,000 Yen/$400,000. The current title holder is Iyama Yuta.
 Honinbo is a title sponsored by the Mainichi Shimbun Newspaper. The winner's purse is 32,000,000 Yen/$350,000. The current title holder is Iyama Yuta.
 Ōza is a title sponsored by the Nihon Keizai Newspaper. The winner's purse is 14,000,000 Yen/$153,000. The current title holder is Shibano Toramaru.
 Tengen is a title sponsored by the Three Newspaper Companies Newspaper. The winner's purse is 13,000,000 Yen/$117,767. The current title holder is Ichiriki Ryo.
 Gosei is a title sponsored by the Regional Newspapers League. The winner's purse is 8,000,000 Yen/$72,464. The current title holder is Iyama Yuta.
 Judan is a title sponsored by the Sankei Newspaper. The winner's purse is 7,000,000 Yen/$63,406. The current title holder is Shibano Toramaru.

Minor
 Shinjin-O is a title sponsored by the Akahata Newspaper. The winner's purse is 2,000,000 Yen/$29,000. The current title holder is Hirose Yuichi.
 Okan is a title sponsored by the Chunichi Newspaper. The winner's purse is 1,700,000 Yen/$15,000. The current title holder is Ida Atsushi.
 Daiwa Cup is a title sponsored by Daiwa Securities Group. The winner's purse is 3,000,000 Yen/$12,700. The current title holder is Yuki Satoshi. 	

Hayago
 NEC Cup is a title sponsored by NEC. The winner's purse is 17,000,000 Yen/$130,000. The current title holder is Takao Shinji.
 Agon Kiriyama Cup is a title sponsored by Agon Shu. The winner's purse is 10,000,000 Yen/$86,000. The current title holder is Ichiriki Ryo.
 NHK Cup is a title sponsored by NHK. The winner's purse is 5,000,000 Yen/$43,000. The current title holder is Ichiriki Ryo.
 Ryusei is a title sponsored by the Satellite Culture Japan. The winner's purse is 5,000,000 Yen/$43,000. The current title holder is Ichiriki Ryo.

Kansai Ki-in 
 Kansai Ki-in Championship is a title sponsored by Sanyo Shimbun. The current title holder is Yuki Satoshi.

Defunct tournaments

 Asahi Pro Best Ten
 Asahi Top Eight Players
 Asahi Top Position
 Chikurin
 Dai-ichi
 Hayago Championship
 Hayago Meijin
 Hosu
 IBM Cup
 Igo Masters Cup (2011–2019)
 Igo Senshuken
 JAL Super Hayago Championship
 JT Cup
 Kansai Ki-In Championship
 Kakusei
 Kirin Cup
 NEC Shun-Ei
 Nihon Ki-In Championship
 Old Meijin
 Phoenix Cup
 Prime Minister Cup
 Ryuen Cup
 Shin-Ei
 Tatsujin

Women's

Nihon Ki-in
 Women's Honinbo is a title sponsored by Kyodo News Agency. The winner's purse is 5,500,000 Yen. The current title holder is Fujisawa Rina.
 Women's Meijin is a title sponsored by Fuji Evening Newspaper. The winner's purse is 5,100,000 Yen/$44,500. The current title holder is Fujisawa Rina.
 Women's Kisei is a title sponsored by NTT DoCoMo. The winner's purse is 5,000,000 Yen/$43,500. The current title holder is Ueno Asami.
 Aizu Central Hospital Cup is a title sponsored by the Aidu Chuo Hospital Cup. The prize for winning is 7,000,000 Yen. The current title holder is Fujisawa Rina.
 Women's Saikyo was a title sponsored by Tokyo Seimitsu until 2008. It was resurrected in 2016 and is now known as the Senko Cup Female Saiko (or just Senko Cup). The prize for winning purse is 8,000,000 Yen.  The current title holder is Ueno Asami.

Defunct tournaments
 Women's Nihon Ki-in Championship
 Women's Kakusei
 Women's JAL Super Hayago

Kansai Ki-in
 Kansai Lady's Tournament is a title sponsored by TV Osaka. The current title holder is Konishi Kazuko.

See also

 European Go Cup
 Honorary Go titles
 Go players

Notes

References

External links

 Nihon Ki-in page for Japanese domestic tournaments (in Japanese)
 Nihon Ki-in page for international tournaments (in Japanese)

 
Professional Go tournaments
Go tournaments